BDS may refer to:

Companies and organizations
 Bergenske Dampskibsselskab, a Norwegian shipping service
 Black Dragon Society, a Japanese paramilitary organization
 Blessed Damien Society, a leprosy charity
 Blue Diamond Society, a Nepalese LGBT rights organization
 Boeing Defense, Space & Security
 Boycott, Divestment and Sanctions, political movement that advocates boycotting Israel in support of the rights of Palestinian people
 British Dragonfly Society, an insect conservation group
 Broadcasting Dataservices, a United Kingdom TV listings service
 League of Democratic Socialists (Bund Demokratischer Sozialisten), a former Austrian political party
 Bund Deutscher Sportschützen, Federation of German Marksmen
 Nielsen Broadcast Data Systems, a service that tracks monitored radio, television and internet airplay of songs

People
 bds, pseudonym of Andreas Thorstensson (born 1979), Swedish entrepreneur and Counter-Strike player

Places
 Bryant–Denny Stadium, in Tuscaloosa, Alabama
 Belgrano Day School, in Buenos Aires, Argentina

Transport
 Bois d'Arc and Southern Railway (defunct), in Texas
 Bond Street station (station code), in London, England
 Brindisi Airport (IATA code BDS), in Italy

Other
Bachelor of Dental Surgery, a professional degree
BeiDou Navigation Satellite System, in China
Bonde da Stronda, a Brazilian musical group
Burnham Double Star Catalogue
Bush Derangement Syndrome, a U.S. political epithet
Barbadian dollar often incorrectly "BDS$", the currency of Barbados (officially ISO 4217 code: "BBD")
BDS, The International vehicle registration code for Barbados
BDS-1, a polypeptide
BDS C, an early programming language compiler

See also
 BD (disambiguation), any of several entities that may be pluralized "BDs"